Ada of Holland may refer to:

 Ada of Holland, Margravine of Brandenburg ( – after 1205)
 Ada, Countess of Holland ( – 1234/37 )
 Ada of Holland (died 1258) (1208–1258), abbess of Rijnsburg Abbey from 1239